Edythe Morahan de Lauzon was a Canadian poet. She is possibly best known for her poem collection Angels' Songs from the Golden City of the Blessed published in 1918 and From The Kingdom Of The Stars in 1922. Inspired by the First World War, she engaged in  issues concerning war and German nationalism in her poems. She lived in Quebec and was a committed Christian and spiritualist.

See also

 Canadian literature
 List of Canadian poets
 List of English language poets

External links
 Online Book

20th-century Canadian poets
Canadian women poets
20th-century Canadian women writers
Year of birth missing
Year of death missing